The Ciudad Deportiva Getafe CF is the training ground and academy base of the Spanish football club Getafe CF. It was opened in 2005.

Located in Getafe near the Coliseum Alfonso Pérez and covering an area of 70,000 m², it is used for youth and senior teams trainings.

Facilities
 Ciudad Deportiva Stadium with a capacity of 1,500 seats, is the home stadium of Getafe CF B, the reserve team of Getafe CF.
 1 grass pitch.
 3 artificial pitches.
 2 mini artificial pitches.
 Service centre with gymnasium.

Links
Stadium History Estadios de España

References

Getafe CF
Getafe
Sports venues completed in 2005
Buildings and structures in Getafe